Miroslav Popov (born November 26, 1957) is a Serbian professional basketball coach for Tianjin Ronggang of the Women's Chinese Basketball Association (WCBA).

Coaching career

Men's basketball 
Popov coached Lions Vršac in the 2003–04 season and Bosnian team Leotar Trebinje during 2007–08 season.

Women's club basketball 
Popov spent a big part of his coaching career with Hemofarm from Vršac. He was an assistant coach from 1993 to 1999, and a head coach three times: 1999–2003, 2004–2005 and 2010–2013.

Also, Popov coached teams in Italy and Romania. He was a coach of Italian team Mercede Basket Alghero for two seasons. In Romania, he was a head coach for CSU Alba Iulia for five seasons.

During the 2019–20 season Popov coached Tianjin Ronggang of the Women's Chinese Basketball Association.

Women national teams 
FR Yugoslavia
Popov was a head coach for the FR Yugoslavia women's national team at the EuroBasket Women 2001 and 2002 FIBA World Championship for Women.

Romania
Popov was a head coach for the Romania women's national team.

Career achievements and awards
Head Coach
 Central Europe Women's League champion: 2 (with CSU Alba Iulia: 2013–14, 2015–16)
 FR Yugoslavia/Serbia and Montenegro Women's League champion: 3 (with Hemofarm: 1999–00, 2000–01, 2004–05)
 Milan Ciga Vasojević Cup winner: 2 (with Hemofarm: 2009–10, 2011–12)
 FR Yugoslavia/Serbia and Montenegro Women's Cup winner: 2 (with Hemofarm: 2001–02, 2004–05)
Assistant Coach
 FR Yugoslavia Women's League champion: 2 (with Hemofarm: 1997–98, 1998–99)
 FR Yugoslavia Women's Cup: 3 (with Hemofarm: 1995–96, 1997–98, 1998–99)

References

External links 
 Coach Profile at eurobasket.com
 Biography at kosarkaskitrenerivojvodine.rs
 

1957 births
Living people
KK Hemofarm coaches
KK Lions/Swisslion Vršac coaches
KK Leotar coaches
Serbia and Montenegro national basketball team coaches
Serbian men's basketball coaches
Serbian expatriate basketball people in China
Serbian expatriate basketball people in Italy
Serbian expatriate basketball people in Romania
University of Novi Sad alumni
People from Vršac